Pica or PICA may refer to:

Biology
 Pica (disorder), an abnormal appetite for earth and other non-foods
 Posterior inferior cerebellar artery, a major artery supplying blood to the cerebellum

Organisms
 Aechmea 'Pica', a hybrid cultivar in the Bromeliad family of flowering plants
 Pica (genus), a genus of magpie
 Pika, a small mammal (archaic spelling "pica")

Organizations
 OCLC PICA, a library automation company
 Palestine Jewish Colonization Association, known by its Yiddish acronym as PICA
 Pennsylvania Intergovernmental Cooperation Authority, a governmental agency in Philadelphia, Pennsylvania
 Perth Institute of Contemporary Arts, Western Australia
 Pica Press, a publishing imprint
 Pittsburgh Intergovernmental Cooperation Authority, a governmental agency in Pittsburgh, Pennsylvania
 Portland Institute for Contemporary Art, Oregon

People
 Antonio Pica (1923–2014), Spanish actor
 Joe Pica (1923–1973), American pianist
 Pierre Pica (born 1951), French linguist
 Teresa P. Pica (1945–2011), American educator
 Tina Pica (1884–1968), Italian actress
 Yamantaka Eye (born 1964), Japanese artist known as DJ Pica Pica Pica (DJ 光光光)

Places
 Pica, Chile, an oasis town in the Atacama Desert of Chile
Limón de Pica, a lime variety from Pica
 Pica, Cumbria, a village in northwest England
 Pica, Jayuya, Puerto Rico, a barrio

Technology
 Acer PICA, a system logic chipset introduced in 1993
 Phenolic-impregnated carbon ablator, a spacecraft heat shield material
 Pre-integrated COF APM, part of the International Space Station's Columbus module systems

Other uses
 Pica, an alternative name for the grape Merille
 Pica, a lance used by a picador in bullfighting
 Pica (typography), a unit of length used in typesetting and document layout
 píča, a rude expression for a vagina in the Czech Republic and Slovakia

See also
 Pico (disambiguation)
 Piga (disambiguation)
 Pika (disambiguation)